Los viejos somos así is a 1948 Mexican comedy-drama film directed by and starring Joaquín Pardavé, Elsa Aguirre, and Víctor Junco.

References

External links
 

1948 films
1940s Spanish-language films
1948 comedy-drama films
Mexican black-and-white films
Mexican comedy-drama films
1940s Mexican films